Frederick Major Paull Knott (28 August 1916 – 17 December 2002) was an English playwright and screenwriter known for his complex crime-related plots. Although he was a reluctant writer and completed only a small number of plays in his career, two have become well-known: the London-based stage thriller Dial M for Murder, later filmed in Hollywood by Alfred Hitchcock, and the 1966 play Wait Until Dark, which was adapted to a Hollywood film directed by Terence Young. He also wrote the Broadway mystery Write Me a Murder.

Life and career
Knott was born in Hankou, China, the son of English missionaries, Margaret Caroline (Paull) and Cyril Wakefield Knott. He was educated at Oundle School from 1929 to 1934 and later gained a law degree from Cambridge University. He became interested in theatre after watching performances of Gilbert and Sullivan works held by the Hankow Operatic Society.

Frederick Knott was descended from a line of wealthy Lancashire mill-owners, and in 1926 his parents sent him to England, where he studied at Sidcott and Oundle School before going up to Cambridge in 1934. An exceptional tennis player (a profession he gave the central character in Dial M for Murder), he became a Blue and in 1937 he was a member of the Oxford-Cambridge tennis team that played the Harvard-Yale squad at Newport. He graduated in 1938, but the outbreak of the Second World War prevented his competing at Wimbledon.

He served in the British Army Artillery as a signals instructor from 1939 to 1946, rising to the rank of major, and eventually moved to the United States. He met Ann Hillary in 1952 and married her in 1953; they lived in New York for many years.

Although Dial M for Murder was a hit on the stage, it was originally a BBC television production. As a theatre piece, it premiered at the Westminster Theatre in Victoria, London in June 1952, directed by John Fernald and starring Alan MacNaughtan and Jane Baxter. This production was followed in October by a successful run in New York City at the Plymouth Theater, where Reginald Denham directed Maurice Evans, Richard Derr. Gusti Huber. Knott also wrote the screenplay for the 1954 Hollywood movie which Hitchcock filmed for Warner Brothers in 3D, starring Ray Milland and Grace Kelly, with Anthony Dawson and John Williams reprising their characters from the New York stage production, which had won Williams a Tony Award for his role as Inspector Hubbard. He previously sold the screen rights to Alexander Korda for only £1,000. The play was also made into a 1981 TV movie starring Christopher Plummer and Angie Dickinson, as the 1985 film Aitbaar in India, and as A Perfect Murder in 1998 with Michael Douglas and Gwyneth Paltrow. Based on the same plot, a Soviet TV film Tony Wendice's Mistake (:ru:Ошибка Тони Вендиса) was released in 1981.

In 1960, Knott wrote the stage thriller Write Me a Murder, produced at the Belasco Theatre in New York in October 1961. It was directed by George Schaefer and included Denholm Elliott and Kim Hunter in the cast.

In 1966, Knott's stage play Wait Until Dark was produced on Broadway at the Ethel Barrymore Theatre. The director was Arthur Penn and the play starred Lee Remick who received a Tony Award nomination for her performance. Later the same year, Honor Blackman played the lead in London's West End at the Strand Theatre. The film version, also titled Wait Until Dark and released in 1967, had Audrey Hepburn in the lead role. The play ran on Broadway in 2001, featuring Quentin Tarantino.

Knott stopped writing plays, choosing to live comfortably on the income from his earlier works. "I don't think the drive was there any more. He was perfectly happy the way things were," said his wife Ann Hillary. He died in New York City in December 2002.

Select Credits

Feature Films Screenplays
The Last Page (1952)
Dial M for Murder (1954)
The Honey Pot (1967)

TV Plays
Dial M for Murder (1952) – for BBC Sunday-Night Theatre
Hans Brinker and the Silver Skates (1958)
Dial M for Murder (1959) (German TV movie)

Plays
Dial M for Murder
Write Me a Murder
Wait Until Dark

Bibliography
 Dial M for Murder (Samuel French, London )
 Dial M for Murder (Random House Plays, New York 1952)
 Write Me a Murder (Dramatists Play Service Inc, New York 1962)
 Wait Until Dark (Samuel French, London )

References

External links
 
 
 Frederick Knott Papers. General Collection, Beinecke Rare Book and Manuscript Library, Yale University.

1916 births
2002 deaths
Alumni of the University of Cambridge
Edgar Award winners
People educated at Oundle School
People educated at Sidcot School
English male dramatists and playwrights
20th-century English dramatists and playwrights
20th-century English male writers
Writers from Wuhan
English tennis players
Royal Artillery officers
British Army personnel of World War II
English emigrants to the United States